This article is about the particular significance of the year 1831 to Wales and its people.

Incumbents
Lord Lieutenant of Anglesey – Henry Paget, 1st Marquess of Anglesey 
Lord Lieutenant of Brecknockshire – Henry Somerset, 6th Duke of Beaufort
Lord Lieutenant of Caernarvonshire – Peter Drummond-Burrell, 22nd Baron Willoughby de Eresby 
Lord Lieutenant of Cardiganshire – William Edward Powell
Lord Lieutenant of Carmarthenshire – George Rice, 3rd Baron Dynevor 
Lord Lieutenant of Denbighshire – Sir Watkin Williams-Wynn, 5th Baronet    
Lord Lieutenant of Flintshire – Robert Grosvenor, 1st Marquess of Westminster 
Lord Lieutenant of Glamorgan – John Crichton-Stuart, 2nd Marquess of Bute 
Lord Lieutenant of Merionethshire – Sir Watkin Williams-Wynn, 5th Baronet
Lord Lieutenant of Montgomeryshire – Edward Herbert, 2nd Earl of Powis
Lord Lieutenant of Pembrokeshire – Sir John Owen, 1st Baronet
Lord Lieutenant of Radnorshire – George Rodney, 3rd Baron Rodney

Bishop of Bangor – Christopher Bethell 
Bishop of Llandaff – Edward Copleston 
Bishop of St Asaph – William Carey 
Bishop of St Davids – John Jenkinson

Events
28 April–1 June – In the UK general election: 
Robert Fulke Greville is defeated in Pembrokeshire by Sir John Owen of Orielton.
Edward Lloyd-Mostyn, 2nd Baron Mostyn becomes MP for Flintshire.
John Jones of Ystrad is injured in rioting during the election at Carmarthen, causing polling there to be postponed.
3 June – The Merthyr Rising reaches its climax.
5 August – Charles Darwin travels from Shrewsbury to Llangollen with his tutor, Rev Adam Sedgwick, to carry out geological studies. They remain in Wales for more than two weeks.
17 August – The paddle steamer Rothsay Castle is wrecked at the eastern end of the Menai Strait with the loss of 93 lives.
August – John Jones of Ystrad holds the constituency of Carmarthen.
22 October – John Jones of Ystrad and Robert Fulke Greville fight a duel at Tafarnspite.
Repeal of the slate tax.
Port Talbot ironworks opens.
William Rees (Gwilym Hiraethog) becomes a minister.

Arts and literature

New books
John Evans (I. D. Ffraid) – Hanes yr Iddewon

New publications
Autumn – Y Drysorfa a Calvinistic Methodist publication, restarts under the editorship of John Parry.

Music

Births
13 January – William Hugh Evans, minister and author (d. 1909)
May – Dewi Havhesp, poet (d. 1884)
3 May – Sir Walter Vaughan Morgan, Lord Mayor of London (d. 1916)
16 May – David E. Hughes, musician and professor of music (d. 1900)
21 July – Edward Lewis, Welsh-born New Zealand clergyman (d. 1913)
16 October – John Jones (Eos Bradwen), composer (d. 1899)
8 December
William Dykins, poet (d. 1872)
Edward Payson Evans, historian and linguist (d. 1917)
14 December – Griffith John, missionary (d. 1912)
20 December – William T. Davies, Governor of Pennsylvania (d. 1912)
date unknown – William Davies (Gwilym Teilo), writer (d. 1892)

Deaths
1 January – Charles Heath, printer, writer, and radical Mayor of Monmouth, about 70
7 January – Edward "Celtic" Davies, author, 74
17 April – Sir Thomas Mostyn, 6th Baronet, politician, 54
30 April – Elizabeth Herbert, Countess of Pembroke, 93
18 May – John Vaughan, 3rd Earl of Lisburne, landowner and politician, 62
8 June – Sarah Siddons, actress, 75
11 August – Cradock Glascott, Evangelical clergyman and associate of the Wesley brothers, 88
13 August – Dic Penderyn, labourer, 23 (executed)
probable – Joseph Davies, editor of Y Brud a Sylwydd, age unknown

References